Dennis Bell may refer to:

 Dennis Bell (basketball) (born 1951), American basketball player
 Dennis Bell (footballer) (born 1940), Australian rules footballer
 Dennis Bell (journalist) (1948–1995), American journalist
 Dennis Bell (Medal of Honor) (1866–1953), Buffalo Soldier of the Spanish–American War

See also
 Bell (surname)